Giles Muhame is a Ugandan journalist, news editor. He is the founder of Chimpreports; a popular news website in Uganda.

Early life and education background
Muhame was born in 1988, Ibanda District in Western Uganda. He holds a bachelor's degree in journalism and mass communication from Makerere University.

Career
In 2014, he founded Chimpreports an online popular news website in Uganda. Muhame wrote a story about the 'handshake' story which exposed government officials who had awarded themselves large sums of money after winning a court case against Tullow Oil
He has covered the conflicts in Somalia, Democratic Republic of Congo and South Sudan. He is a member on the National Taskforce on 4th Industrial Revolution Technologies.

Other considerations
Muhame has interests in media consultant, e-commerce entrepreneur, farming and real estate. He mentioned Julian Assange and Bob Woodward as his role models. He serves as the president Uganda Online Media Publishers Association since 2016.

References

External references
Biography of Giles Muhame

1988 births
LGBT rights in Uganda
Living people
Ugandan journalists
Africa-focused media
African journalists